Yesterday is a 2019 romantic comedy film directed by Danny Boyle and written by Richard Curtis, based on a story by Jack Barth and Curtis. Himesh Patel stars as struggling musician Jack Malik who suddenly finds himself as the only person who remembers the Beatles and becomes famous for performing their songs. The film also stars Lily James, Joel Fry, Ed Sheeran, and Kate McKinnon. The film is named after the 1965 Beatles song of the same name.

Yesterday was announced in March 2018. Filming began the following month around England, particularly Norfolk and Halesworth in Suffolk. Photography also took place at Wembley Stadium, the Principality Stadium, and in Los Angeles. The filmmakers paid $10 million for the rights to use the Beatles' music. Although none of the band members were involved, Boyle received approval for the project from them or their families.

Yesterday had its world premiere at the Tribeca Film Festival in May 2019, and was released in the United Kingdom and the United States in June 2019, by Universal Pictures. The film grossed $153 million worldwide against a production budget of $26 million. It received positive reviews from critics, with praise for the premise, performances, and musical sequences, but criticism for its familiarity and not exploring the concept further.

Plot
Jack Malik is a struggling singer-songwriter from Lowestoft who plays gigs to tiny audiences. His manager and childhood friend Ellie Appleton encourages him not to give up on his dreams. During a twelve-second global power outage, Jack is hit by a bus. After recovering, he sings the Beatles song "Yesterday" for his friends and discovers they have never heard of the Beatles. 

After searching for the Beatles on the internet and finding the band's records missing from his collection, Jack realizes that he is now living in a world where the group never formed. He begins performing Beatles songs, passing them off as his.

Ellie has Jack record a demo with Gavin, a local music producer. Following a performance on local television, Jack is invited by pop star Ed Sheeran to play as his opening act in Moscow. Ellie, a maths teacher who has parent-teacher conferences scheduled, declines to join him, so Jack's roadie friend Rocky travels with him instead. After the gig, Sheeran challenges Jack to a songwriting duel: after Jack plays "The Long and Winding Road", Sheeran graciously accepts defeat. 

In Los Angeles, Sheeran's ruthless manager Debra Hammer signs Jack to her label and engineers his rise to global fame. At Jack's going-away party before his move to L.A., Ellie confesses that she has always been in love with him. Jack starts recording an album at EastWest Studios but cannot remember the lyrics for "Eleanor Rigby". Hoping to trigger memories, Jack goes to the Beatles' hometown of Liverpool, visiting landmarks such as Strawberry Field, Penny Lane, and the grave of Eleanor Rigby. 

Ellie joins Jack in Liverpool, and they share a drunken evening and kiss, but she tells him she is not interested in a one-night stand. The next morning, Jack and Rocky pursue Ellie to the train station, where she congratulates Jack but tells him she cannot be a part of his celebrity life. He returns to Los Angeles heartbroken and desperate to have an everyday life again, while Ellie begins dating Gavin.

The record label prepares to launch Jack's debut album but reject his title ideas—taken from Beatles albums—and names it One Man Only, pushing his talent. Jack persuades them to launch the album with a rooftop concert in Gorleston-on-Sea. 

Two people who, like Jack, also recall the Beatles, approach him backstage. They tell him they know he didn't write the songs, but thank him, having feared the Beatles' music was gone forever. They give him the address of John Lennon, who, having never formed the Beatles in this reality, has survived into old age, out of the public spotlight. John, who has lived a happy life with his wife, advises Jack to pursue the one he loves and always tell the truth.

Jack calls in a favour with Sheeran, who arranges for him to perform at Wembley Stadium. Jack confesses to the crowd that he plagiarized the music and loves Ellie, and has Rocky upload the songs free on the internet, sabotaging the record release and enraging Debra. Jack and Ellie marry and start a family, and he gives up stardom to become a music teacher.

Cast

In addition, James Corden and Michael Kiwanuka appear as themselves, and Robert Carlyle makes an uncredited appearance as a 78-year-old contented John Lennon.

Production

Writing 
Yesterday began as a 2012 screenplay, Cover Version, by the American writer Jack Barth. Barth had been struggling to sell screenplays for decades, and conceived the story when it occurred to him that if Star Wars had not been created and he conceived it, he would not be able to sell it. In Barth's script, a "meditation on professional disappointment", Jack did not find success with the Beatles songs.

An early version of the screenplay was worked on by the British actor Mackenzie Crook, who intended to direct. Crook left to work on his television series Detectorists. The script was passed to the production company Working Title. Years later, while working on clearance rights for the Beatles songs, a Working Title producer mentioned the screenplay to the British filmmaker Richard Curtis, who bought it and rewrote it as a romantic comedy. On Curtis's insistence, the screenplay is credited to Curtis and the story credited to Curtis and Barth.

Curtis told interviewers he did not read Barth's script, preferring to use the premise to write his own version. He told Den of Geek: "I sometimes found when I worked with original material that it doesn't come from the heart. So I tried to write a whole film that meant something to me, rather than having too much extra information." However, according to Barth, the final film includes many elements of his screenplay, including John Lennon as a wizened fisherman and a joke about Harry Potter. Curtis credited the Harry Potter joke to a suggestion from the American comedian Sarah Silverman, who is thanked in the credits.

Barth complained that Curtis had taken sole credit for the screenplay and damaged him financially. He felt that Curtis had changed the story to make Jack a successful songwriter as a reflection of Curtis's own career: "[Curtis] met Rowan Atkinson at Oxford, he came out of Oxford and immediately rode Rowan Atkinson to huge success in his early twenties. He's never been knocked out, as far as I know. Why wouldn't [Jack] become the most successful songwriter in the world?"

Casting 
In March 2018, it was announced that Curtis and director Danny Boyle were working on a musical comedy set in the 1960s or 1970s following "a struggling musician who thinks he's the only person who can remember the Beatles", with Himesh Patel cast in the lead role. Boyle was convinced Patel was the right choice after listening to him perform the Beatles songs "Yesterday" and "Back in the U.S.S.R." during auditions. Boyle felt that Patel's voice had soul. Patel sang and performed guitar and piano himself.

Later in March 2018, Lily James and Kate McKinnon joined the cast. Boyle informed the surviving members and widows of the Beatles about the film and received a reply he described as "lovely" from Beatles drummer Ringo Starr. In April 2018, it was revealed that Ed Sheeran had joined the cast.  Sheeran's role was originally intended for Coldplay singer Chris Martin, who turned it down. Sheeran said Harry Styles was also asked, which Boyle denied. Ana de Armas and Lamorne Morris joined later in April, followed by Sophia Di Martino, Joel Fry and Harry Michell in May.

Filming 
Filming began on 21 April 2018, with production in the United Kingdom starting on 26 April 2018, with scenes filmed across East Anglia in Cantley, Halesworth, Dunwich, Shingle Street, at the Latitude Festival, and at Clacton-on-Sea. A casting call was issued for extras in overnight scenes shot immediately after Sheeran's four consecutive concerts at the Principality Stadium in Cardiff, Wales in May 2018. A further 5,000 extras appeared in scenes at Gorleston-on-Sea Beach in Norfolk in June 2018. Wembley Stadium was also used to film a concert scene. Filming also took place in Liverpool, making use of Penny Lane, Liverpool John Lennon Airport, Lime Street Station and the Queensway Tunnel.

In February 2019, it was announced that the title of the film was Yesterday. It is estimated to have cost around $10 million to get the rights for the Beatles' songs to be featured in the film, with the rights to their music being held by Apple Records and Sony/ATV Music Publishing. Scenes with de Armas, who played another love interest for Jack, were cut as test audiences felt it made Jack less sympathetic. Ana de Armas appeared in some of the early promotional material before the final edit was made and this has since led to a $5m lawsuit in the US where two fans claim they were "duped into renting the [$3.99] movie because she [de Armas] was in the trailer". A federal judge allowed the class-action lawsuit to proceed in December 2022, stating that "At its core, a trailer is an advertisement designed to sell a movie by providing consumers with a preview of the movie."

Release
The first official trailer of the film was released on 12 February 2019. The film had its world premiere at the Tribeca Film Festival on 4 May 2019. A local screening of the film took place at the Gorleston Palace cinema on 21 June 2019. Universal spent $75.4 million promoting the film worldwide.

Reception

Box office
Yesterday grossed $73.3million in the United States and Canada, and $80.4million in other territories, for a worldwide total of $153.7million, against a production budget of $26million. This includes over  grossed in the United Kingdom.

In the United States and Canada, the film was projected to gross $10–15 million from 2,603 theatres in its opening weekend. The film made $6.1 million on its first day, including $1.25 million from Thursday night previews. It ended up slightly exceeding projections and debuting to $17 million, finishing third behind Toy Story 4 and Annabelle Comes Home. In its second weekend the film made $10.7 million, again finishing in third (behind Spider-Man: Far From Home and Toy Story 4), then grossed $6.8 million in its third weekend, falling to fifth.

Deadline Hollywood calculated the net profit of the film to be $45million, when factoring together all expenses and revenues. Universal officially took an $87.8 million loss on the film in 2019, which Deadline deduced would eventually result in a $26.5 million profit after TV and video sales (an estimated  by early 2020) were taken into account.

Critical response
The website's critics consensus reads: "Yesterday may fall short of fab, but the end result is still a sweetly charming fantasy with an intriguing—albeit somewhat under-explored—premise." On Metacritic, the film has a weighted average score of 55 out of 100, based on 45 critics, indicating "mixed or average reviews". Audiences polled by CinemaScore gave the film an average grade of "A−" on an A+ to F scale, while PostTrak reported 87% of audience members gave the film a positive score, with 63% saying they would definitely recommend it.

Peter Bradshaw of The Guardian gave the film four out of five stars, writing "although this film can be a bit hokey and uncertain on narrative development, the puppyish zest and fun summoned up by Curtis and Boyle carry it along." Robbie Collin also responded positively in his review for The Daily Telegraph, saying the film "rallies in style for a beautifully judged and surprisingly moving finale, which owes a lot to Patel and James's chemistry." Owen Gleiberman of Variety, meanwhile, was less enthusiastic, claiming the film had little soul and calling it a "rom-com wallpapered with the Beatles' greatness." Laura Snapes of The Guardian called Yesterday "the latest jukebox movie to put its women on mute."

Beatles' response 
Paul McCartney revealed in an interview with Billboard that he and his wife Nancy Shevell went to see the film in a cinema in The Hamptons and "loved it". Boyle also sent copies of the completed film to Ringo Starr and his wife Barbara, as well as George Harrison's widow Olivia, and received "lovely messages" from both parties. John Lennon's widow, Yoko Ono, also approved of the film's depiction of her late husband.

Accolades

Comparisons
As remarked upon in the media, a number of other works have had a similar premise or theme involving parallel worlds or time travel. The 2010 Japanese manga  by Tetsuo Fujii and Kaiji Kawaguchi,  involves an almost identical concept of a musician travelling back in time to 1961 and being surprised when he plays "Yesterday" and no one knows of the Beatles, and he similarly plays their material and is successful. Others include the 2011 French graphic novel Yesterday by David Blot and Jérémie Royer (the title, again, alluding to the Beatles song), the 1990s British sitcom Goodnight Sweetheart, the 2006 French film Jean-Philippe, and Nick Milligan's 2013 novel Enormity. Danny Boyle has said he was not aware of earlier works with similar premises when he read the script but had later become aware of a French film and British sitcom with a similar premise after the film's first trailer was revealed.

The film was also compared to Blinded by the Light (2019), a British comedy-drama produced around the same time about an aspiring British Asian writer inspired by the songs of Bruce Springsteen.

See also
 Parallel universes in fiction

References

External links
 

2010s fantasy comedy films
2010s musical comedy films
2019 films
2019 romantic comedy films
American alternate history films
American fantasy comedy films
American musical comedy films
American rock music films
American romantic comedy films
The Beatles in film
British alternative history films
British fantasy comedy films
British musical comedy films
British rock music films
British romantic comedy films
Cultural depictions of John Lennon
Films about guitars and guitarists
Films about parallel universes
Films about singers
Films directed by Danny Boyle
Films produced by Eric Fellner
Films produced by Tim Bevan
Films scored by Daniel Pemberton
Films set in 2019
Films set in Liverpool
Films set in Los Angeles
Films set in Moscow
Films set in Norfolk
Films set in Suffolk
Films shot in Liverpool
Films shot in Suffolk
Films with screenplays by Richard Curtis
Universal Pictures films
Working Title Films films
2010s English-language films
2010s American films
2010s British films
Advertising and marketing controversies in film
Casting controversies in film
Works subject to a lawsuit
Film controversies
Film controversies in the United States